Albuera, officially the Municipality of Albuera, is a 3rd class municipality in the province of Leyte, Philippines. According to the 2020 census, it has a population of 47,151 people.

Geography

Barangays
Albuera is politically subdivided into 16 barangays.

Climate

Demographics

Economy

History

Mayor shot dead inside prison

On November 4, 2016, 1st-term Albuera Mayor Rolando Espinosa Sr., who was linked to illegal drugs through his son and alleged drug lord Rolan "Kerwin" Espinosa, was shot dead inside his prison cell at the Baybay City Sub Provincial Jail. Espinosa was replaced by his vice mayor Rosa Meneses while councilor Sixto dela Victoria filled in as vice mayor.

Education
Albuera has 4 secondary schools
 Balugo National High School
 Damula-an National High School
 Doctor Geronimo B. Zaldivar Memorial School of Fisheries
 Seguinon National High School

References

External links
Official website
 [ Philippine Standard Geographic Code]
Philippine Census Information
Local Governance Performance Management System

Municipalities of Leyte (province)